Puanama is a genus of longhorn beetles of the subfamily Lamiinae, containing the following species:

 Puanama caraca Galileo & Martins, 1995
 Puanama sara Galileo & Martins, 1998
 Puanama sinopia Galileo & Martins, 1995

References

Eupromerini